Belzer ( or ), or Beltzer , is a Yiddish surname. It derives from the adjectival form of Belz (Galicia) or Bălți (Bessarabia), both shtetlekh. It can mean adjective form, or a member of the Belzer Hasidim.

People with the surname
 Bill Belzer
 Chazzan Nissi Belzer (Nisn Spivak)
 Francis O. Belzer
 Richard Belzer, comedian and actor
Seth Belzer

See also 
 Belser